Methorphan comes in two isomeric forms, each with differing pharmacology and effects:

 Dextromethorphan - An over-the-counter cough suppressant, as well as dissociative hallucinogen.
 Levomethorphan - A potent opioid analgesic that was never clinically developed; a prodrug of the powerful opioid agonist analgesic levorphanol (Levo-Dromoran).

Racemethorphan is the racemic mixture of both of these stereoisomers.  It is listed under the Single Convention on Narcotic Drugs 1961 and is therefore listed in the United States as a Controlled Substance, specifically as a Narcotic in Schedule II with an ACSCN of 9732 and an annual aggregate manufacturing quota of 3 grams in 2014.  The salts in use are the hydrobromide (free base conversion ratio 0.770) and the tartrate (0.644)

See also 
 Morphinan
 Racemorphan

References 

Morphinans
Phenol ethers
Synthetic opioids